Elgin is both a surname and a given name. Notable people with the name include:

Surname
Catherine Elgin (born 1948), American philosopher 
Duane Elgin (born 1943), American author, speaker, educator, consultant, and media activist
Dwayne Elgin (born 1976), Guyanese-born Sint Maartener cricketer 
Michael Elgin (born 1986), professional wrestler
Michail Elgin (born 1981), Russian tennis player
Mike Elgin (born 1983), offensive guard for the New England Patriots
Sarah Elgin, American biochemist and geneticist
Suzette Haden Elgin (1936-2015), science fiction author and linguist

Given name

First name
Elgin Baylor (1934–2021), American basketball player, coach and executive
Elgin Cook (born 1993), American basketball player 
Elgin Davis (born 1965), American football player
Elgin Gates (1933–1988), American hunter and firearms technician
Elgin James, American filmmaker and musician
Elgin Lessley (1883–1944), American cinematographer

Middle name
Horace Elgin Dodge (1868–1920), American businessman

Masculine given names